Diaporthe is a genus of endophytic filamentous fungal plant pathogens.

Diaporthe species have been shown to transform the infection-inhibiting factors (+)-catechin and (−)-epicatechin into the 3,4-cis-dihydroxyflavan derivatives.

Some species, like Diaporthe toxica, produce secondary metabolites that result in toxicoses of animals such as lupinosis of sheep.

Selected species

 Diaporthe arctii
 Diaporthe citri
 Diaporthe dulcamarae
 Diaporthe eres
 Diaporthe fraxini-angustifoliae
 Diaporthe helianthi
 Diaporthe lagunensis
 Diaporthe litchicola
 Diaporthe lokoyae
 Diaporthe melonis
 Diaporthe orthoceras
 Diaporthe nothofagi
 Diaporthe pascoei
 Diaporthe perniciosa
 Diaporthe phaseolorum
Diaporthe phaseolorum var. caulivora
Diaporthe phaseolorum var. phaseolorum
Diaporthe phaseolorum var. sojae
 Diaporthe rudis
 Diaporthe salicicola
 Diaporthe tanakae
 Diaporthe toxica

Complete species

Diaporthe abdita
Diaporthe aberrans
Diaporthe abutilonis
Diaporthe acaciae
Diaporthe acaciigena
Diaporthe acerina
Diaporthe actinidiae
Diaporthe aculeata
Diaporthe acus
Diaporthe adunca
Diaporthe aesculicola
Diaporthe aetoxici
Diaporthe affinis
Diaporthe aggerum
Diaporthe ahmadii
Diaporthe ailanthi
Diaporthe ailanthi var. ailanthi
Diaporthe ailanthi var. megacera
Diaporthe ailanthicola
Diaporthe albocincta
Diaporthe aliena
Diaporthe alleghaniensis
Diaporthe alnea
Diaporthe amaranthi
Diaporthe ambiens
Diaporthe americana
Diaporthe amorphae
Diaporthe androsaemi
Diaporthe angelicae
Diaporthe anisomera
Diaporthe annonae
Diaporthe antarctica
Diaporthe aorista
Diaporthe apiculosa
Diaporthe apocrypta
Diaporthe appendiculata
Diaporthe araliae
Diaporthe arctii
Diaporthe arctii var. arctii
Diaporthe artospora
Diaporthe asclepiadis
Diaporthe asparagi
Diaporthe asphodeli
Diaporthe asteriscina
Diaporthe astrostoma
Diaporthe atropuncta
Diaporthe aucubae
Diaporthe australafricana
Diaporthe australis
Diaporthe austroamericana
Diaporthe baccharidis
Diaporthe baccharidis var. baccharidis
Diaporthe baccharidis var. gallica
Diaporthe bakeri
Diaporthe bambusae
Diaporthe baptisiae
Diaporthe batatas
Diaporthe beckhausii
Diaporthe beilharziae
Diaporthe berlesiana
Diaporthe bicincta
Diaporthe biglobosa
Diaporthe binoculata
Diaporthe binoculata var. binoculata
Diaporthe binoculata var. clethrae
Diaporthe binoculata var. magnoliae-acuminata
Diaporthe boehmeriae
Diaporthe bonafidii
Diaporthe brachystoma
Diaporthe brenckleana
Diaporthe brenkleana
Diaporthe briardiana
Diaporthe broussonetiae
Diaporthe buxi
Diaporthe callicarpae
Diaporthe calosphaeriodes
Diaporthe calosphaerioides
Diaporthe camelliae
Diaporthe canina
Diaporthe capsici
Diaporthe caraganae
Diaporthe carpini
Diaporthe carpini f. carpini
Diaporthe carpini f. sordida
Diaporthe carpini var. carpini
Diaporthe carpini var. quercina
Diaporthe carpinigera
Diaporthe caryigena
Diaporthe castaneti
Diaporthe castrensis
Diaporthe castriformis
Diaporthe casuarinae
Diaporthe catalpae
Diaporthe catamarcensis
Diaporthe ceanothi
Diaporthe celastrina
Diaporthe celata
Diaporthe centrophylli
Diaporthe cercophora
Diaporthe cestri
Diaporthe chailletii
Diaporthe chailletii var. chailletii
Diaporthe chailletii var. molleri
Diaporthe chamaeropina
Diaporthe characiae
Diaporthe chionanthi
Diaporthe chrysoides
Diaporthe ciliata
Diaporthe cinerascens
Diaporthe circumscripta
Diaporthe citri
Diaporthe citrincola
Diaporthe claviceps
Diaporthe clerodendri
Diaporthe coemansii
Diaporthe coffeae
Diaporthe colletiae
Diaporthe colletiicola
Diaporthe columbiensis
Diaporthe compressa
Diaporthe comptoniae
Diaporthe comptoniae var. berolinensis
Diaporthe comptoniae var. comptoniae
Diaporthe concrescens
Diaporthe coneglanensis
Diaporthe congener
Diaporthe congesta
Diaporthe conigena
Diaporthe conjucta
Diaporthe conjuncta
Diaporthe conradii
Diaporthe convexa
Diaporthe corallodendri
Diaporthe coramblicola
Diaporthe corni
Diaporthe cornicola
Diaporthe cornicola var. acuta
Diaporthe cornicola var. cornicola
Diaporthe coronillae
Diaporthe corymbosa
Diaporthe crassiuscula
Diaporthe crataegi
Diaporthe crinigera
Diaporthe crotalariae
Diaporthe crustosa
Diaporthe cryptica
Diaporthe culta
Diaporthe cupulata
Diaporthe curvatispora
Diaporthe cydoniae
Diaporthe cydoniicola
Diaporthe cylindrospora
Diaporthe cynaroidis
Diaporthe dakotensis
Diaporthe decipiens
Diaporthe decorticans
Diaporthe delitescens
Diaporthe delogneana
Diaporthe demissa
Diaporthe densa
Diaporthe densissima
Diaporthe desmazieri
Diaporthe desmazieri var. desmazieri
Diaporthe desmazieri var. melampyri
Diaporthe desmodiana
Diaporthe desmodii
Diaporthe detrusa
Diaporthe dichaenoides
Diaporthe dickiae
Diaporthe didymelloides
Diaporthe difficilior
Diaporthe digitifera
Diaporthe digitifera var. digitifera
Diaporthe digitifera var. lignicola
Diaporthe diospyri
Diaporthe dircae
Diaporthe disputata
Diaporthe disputata var. disputata
Diaporthe disputata var. ulmi
Diaporthe disseminata
Diaporthe dolosa
Diaporthe dorycnea
Diaporthe dorycnii
Diaporthe drimydis
Diaporthe dryophila
Diaporthe dubia
Diaporthe dulcamarae
Diaporthe eburensis
Diaporthe elaeagni
Diaporthe elaeagni var. americana
Diaporthe elaeagni var. elaeagni
Diaporthe elephantina
Diaporthe ellisii
Diaporthe epilobii
Diaporthe epimicta
Diaporthe eres
Diaporthe eucalypti
Diaporthe eucalypticola
Diaporthe eumorpha
Diaporthe euonymi
Diaporthe euryala
Diaporthe euspina
Diaporthe eusticha
Diaporthe exercitalis
Diaporthe exiguistroma
Diaporthe extorris
Diaporthe extranea
Diaporthe faberi
Diaporthe fagi
Diaporthe fagi var. fagi
Diaporthe fagi var. longispora
Diaporthe fallaciosa
Diaporthe farinosa
Diaporthe fasciculata
Diaporthe fasciculata f. albizzia
Diaporthe fasciculata f. fasciculata
Diaporthe fasciculata var. fasciculata
Diaporthe fasciculata var. meliloti
Diaporthe feltgenii
Diaporthe feltgenii var. cydoniae
Diaporthe feltgenii var. feltgenii
Diaporthe fibrosa
Diaporthe flageoletiana
Diaporthe floresiana
Diaporthe floridana
Diaporthe foeniculacea
Diaporthe forabilis
Diaporthe forabilis f. acervata
Diaporthe forabilis f. forabilis
Diaporthe fraxini-angustifoliae
Diaporthe fuchsiae
Diaporthe fuckelii
Diaporthe fuegiana
Diaporthe furfuracea
Diaporthe fusispora
Diaporthe galligena
Diaporthe gallophila
Diaporthe garryae
Diaporthe genistae
Diaporthe geographica
Diaporthe geranii
Diaporthe gillesiana
Diaporthe gladioli
Diaporthe glandulosa
Diaporthe gloriosa
Diaporthe gorgonoidea
Diaporthe grammodes
Diaporthe griseotingens
Diaporthe halesiae
Diaporthe hamamelidis
Diaporthe hederae
Diaporthe helianthi
Diaporthe helicis
Diaporthe hemicrypta
Diaporthe heveae
Diaporthe hickoriae
Diaporthe hippophaës
Diaporthe hircini
Diaporthe humboldtiana
Diaporthe hydrangeae
Diaporthe hypospilina
Diaporthe hypoxyloides
Diaporthe hystricula
Diaporthe idaeicola
Diaporthe ilicis
Diaporthe immaculata
Diaporthe immersa
Diaporthe immutabilis
Diaporthe importata
Diaporthe impulsa
Diaporthe inaequalis
Diaporthe incarcerata
Diaporthe incompta
Diaporthe incongrua
Diaporthe incrustans
Diaporthe indica
Diaporthe indigoferae
Diaporthe inflatula
Diaporthe innata
Diaporthe inornata
Diaporthe insignis
Diaporthe insularis
Diaporthe intermedia
Diaporthe interrupta
Diaporthe ipomoeae
Diaporthe italica
Diaporthe jaffueli
Diaporthe japonica
Diaporthe javanica
Diaporthe jeffueli
Diaporthe juglandina
Diaporthe juniperi
Diaporthe kalmiae
Diaporthe kellermaniana
Diaporthe kentrophylli
Diaporthe ketmiae
Diaporthe koelreuteriae
Diaporthe kokiae
Diaporthe kriegeriana
Diaporthe kunashirensis
Diaporthe kunzeana
Diaporthe kyushuensis
Diaporthe lagunensis
Diaporthe landeghemiae
Diaporthe landeghemiae f. deutziae-scabrae
Diaporthe landeghemiae f. landeghemiae
Diaporthe larseniana
Diaporthe laschii
Diaporthe lentaginis
Diaporthe leuceriicola
Diaporthe leucopis
Diaporthe leucosarca
Diaporthe leucostroma
Diaporthe leycesteriae
Diaporthe leyeesteriae
Diaporthe libera
Diaporthe ligulata
Diaporthe ligustri
Diaporthe ligustrina
Diaporthe ligustri-vulgaris
Diaporthe lineariformis
Diaporthe linearis
Diaporthe lirellaeformis
Diaporthe litchicola
Diaporthe lithraeae
Diaporthe lixivia
Diaporthe lokoyae
Diaporthe ludwigiana
Diaporthe lupini
Diaporthe lusitanicae
Diaporthe maclurae
Diaporthe macounii
Diaporthe macrospora
Diaporthe macrostalagmia
Diaporthe macrostoma
Diaporthe maculans
Diaporthe maculosa
Diaporthe magellanica
Diaporthe magnifica
Diaporthe magnispora
Diaporthe magnoliae
Diaporthe mahoniae
Diaporthe mahoniae f. foliicola
Diaporthe mahoniae f. mahoniae
Diaporthe mamiania
Diaporthe mamiania var. mamiania
Diaporthe mamiania var. valsiformis
Diaporthe manihotis
Diaporthe marchica
Diaporthe marginalis
Diaporthe mate
Diaporthe mattfeldii
Diaporthe mazzantioides
Diaporthe medusina
Diaporthe megalospora
Diaporthe melaena
Diaporthe melanocarpa
Diaporthe melonis
Diaporthe melonis var. brevistylospora
Diaporthe melonis var. melonis
Diaporthe mendax
Diaporthe menispermi
Diaporthe menispermoides
Diaporthe meridionalis
Diaporthe mezerei
Diaporthe microcarpa
Diaporthe micromegala
Diaporthe microplaca
Diaporthe microstoma
Diaporthe microstroma
Diaporthe milleriana
Diaporthe minastri
Diaporthe minuscula
Diaporthe minuta
Diaporthe mitis
Diaporthe mori
Diaporthe moriokaensis
Diaporthe mucosa
Diaporthe mucronata
Diaporthe mucronulata
Diaporthe muehlenbeckiae
Diaporthe multipunctata
Diaporthe muralis
Diaporthe murrayi
Diaporthe musae
Diaporthe musigena
Diaporthe myinda
Diaporthe neapolitana
Diaporthe neilliae
Diaporthe neotheicola
Diaporthe nepetae
Diaporthe nerii
Diaporthe niessliana
Diaporthe nigrella
Diaporthe nigricolor
Diaporthe nigroannulata
Diaporthe nigrocincta
Diaporthe nitschkei
Diaporthe nivosa
Diaporthe nobilis
Diaporthe nodosa
Diaporthe nomurai
Diaporthe nothofagi
Diaporthe nucis-avellanae
Diaporthe oblita
Diaporthe obsoleta
Diaporthe occidentalis
Diaporthe occultata
Diaporthe ocularia
Diaporthe oligocarpa
Diaporthe oligocarpoides
Diaporthe oncostoma
Diaporthe ontariensis
Diaporthe opuli
Diaporthe orientalis
Diaporthe orobanches
Diaporthe orthoceras
Diaporthe orthoceras f. achilleae
Diaporthe orthoceras f. helianthi
Diaporthe orthoceras f. orthoceras
Diaporthe orthoceras var. decidua
Diaporthe orthoceras var. orthoceras
Diaporthe ostryigena
Diaporthe otthii
Diaporthe oudemansii
Diaporthe oxyspora
Diaporthe pachystoma
Diaporthe padicola
Diaporthe palmarum
Diaporthe palustris
Diaporthe pampeana
Diaporthe pandanicola
Diaporthe parabolica
Diaporthe pardalota
Diaporthe parvula
Diaporthe pascoei
Diaporthe patagonulae
Diaporthe paulula
Diaporthe peckiana
Diaporthe peckii
Diaporthe pennsylvanica
Diaporthe perexigua
Diaporthe perjuncta
Diaporthe perniciosa
Diaporthe perniciosa f. perniciosa
Diaporthe personata
Diaporthe petiolarum
Diaporthe petiolorum
Diaporthe petrakiana
Diaporthe phaceliae
Diaporthe phaseolorum
Diaporthe phaseolorum var. batatae
Diaporthe phaseolorum var. caulivora
Diaporthe phaseolorum var. meridionalis
Diaporthe phaseolorum var. phaseolorum
Diaporthe phaseolorum var. sojae
Diaporthe phillyreae
Diaporthe phoenicis
Diaporthe pholeodes
Diaporthe picea
Diaporthe pimeleae
Diaporthe pinastri
Diaporthe pinicola
Diaporthe pinophylla
Diaporthe pithya
Diaporthe placoides
Diaporthe plantaginis
Diaporthe platasca
Diaporthe polygoni
Diaporthe polygonicola
Diaporthe pratensis
Diaporthe prenanthicola
Diaporthe priva
Diaporthe pruni
Diaporthe prunicola
Diaporthe psoraleae-bituminosae
Diaporthe pteleae
Diaporthe pulchella
Diaporthe pulchra
Diaporthe pulla
Diaporthe punctostoma
Diaporthe punctulata
Diaporthe pungens
Diaporthe pusilla
Diaporthe pustulata
Diaporthe putator
Diaporthe pycnostoma
Diaporthe pyri
Diaporthe quadruplex
Diaporthe quercina
Diaporthe quilmensis
Diaporthe racemula
Diaporthe radicina
Diaporthe radula
Diaporthe raphani
Diaporthe recedens
Diaporthe recondita
Diaporthe rehmiana
Diaporthe resecanti
Diaporthe retecta
Diaporthe revellens
Diaporthe rhamnigena
Diaporthe rhanicensis
Diaporthe rhoina
Diaporthe rhois
Diaporthe rhusicola
Diaporthe rhynchophora
Diaporthe ribesia
Diaporthe ricini
Diaporthe rickholtii
Diaporthe robusta
Diaporthe rubiae
Diaporthe rudis
Diaporthe ryckholtii
Diaporthe saccardoana
Diaporthe saccardoana var. moravica
Diaporthe saccardoana var. saccardoana
Diaporthe sacchari
Diaporthe sachalinensis
Diaporthe salinicola
Diaporthe salicicola
Diaporthe salsuginosa
Diaporthe salviicola
Diaporthe samaricola
Diaporthe sambuci
Diaporthe santonensis
Diaporthe sarmenticia
Diaporthe sarothamni
Diaporthe sarothamni var. baccharidis
Diaporthe sarothamni var. sarothamni
Diaporthe scabra
Diaporthe scandens
Diaporthe scobina
Diaporthe scobinoides
Diaporthe sechalinensis
Diaporthe semi-immersa
Diaporthe semi-insculpta
Diaporthe seneciicola
Diaporthe seposita
Diaporthe sheariana
Diaporthe silvestris
Diaporthe simplicior
Diaporthe simulans
Diaporthe skimmiae
Diaporthe sociabilis
Diaporthe sociabilis var. sambuci
Diaporthe sociabilis var. sociabilis
Diaporthe sociata
Diaporthe solani-verbascifolii
Diaporthe sophorae
Diaporthe sorbariae
Diaporthe sorbicola
Diaporthe sordida
Diaporthe sparsa
Diaporthe spectabilis
Diaporthe sphaeralceae
Diaporthe sphendamnina
Diaporthe sphingiophora
Diaporthe spicata
Diaporthe spiculosa
Diaporthe spinosula
Diaporthe spinulosa
Diaporthe spiraeicola
Diaporthe spissa
Diaporthe sponheimeri
Diaporthe staphylina
Diaporthe stereostoma
Diaporthe stewartii
Diaporthe stictostoma
Diaporthe stilbostoma
Diaporthe striiformis
Diaporthe strumella
Diaporthe strumella var. pteleae
Diaporthe strumella var. pungens
Diaporthe strumellaeformis
Diaporthe subaquila
Diaporthe subcongrua
Diaporthe subcorticalis
Diaporthe subpyramidata
Diaporthe sydowiana
Diaporthe syngenesia
Diaporthe syngenesia f. nigricolor
Diaporthe syngenesia f. syngenesia
Diaporthe syngenisia
Diaporthe tageteos
Diaporthe take
Diaporthe talae
Diaporthe tamaricina
Diaporthe tami
Diaporthe tanakae
Diaporthe taxi
Diaporthe taxicola
Diaporthe tecomae
Diaporthe tecta
Diaporthe tenella
Diaporthe tenuirostris
Diaporthe terebinthi
Diaporthe tetraptera
Diaporthe tetraspora
Diaporthe teucrii
Diaporthe theicola
Diaporthe therryana
Diaporthe thujana
Diaporthe tiliacea
Diaporthe tillandsiae
Diaporthe tortuosa
Diaporthe toxica
Diaporthe transiens
Diaporthe transversalis
Diaporthe trecassium
Diaporthe trinucleata
Diaporthe triostei
Diaporthe tropicalis
Diaporthe tuberculosa
Diaporthe tuberculosa var. corymbosa
Diaporthe tuberculosa var. dispersa
Diaporthe tuberculosa var. tuberculosa
Diaporthe tulasnei
Diaporthe tulasnei f. galegae
Diaporthe tulasnei f. tulasnei
Diaporthe tumulata
Diaporthe tupae
Diaporthe uliginosa
Diaporthe ulmicola
Diaporthe utahensis
Diaporthe vaccinii
Diaporthe vacillans
Diaporthe valerianae
Diaporthe valida
Diaporthe valparadisiensis
Diaporthe valsiformis
Diaporthe varians
Diaporthe verbenae
Diaporthe verecunda
Diaporthe veronicae
Diaporthe verrucella
Diaporthe viburni
Diaporthe viburni var. viburni
Diaporthe vincae
Diaporthe viticola
Diaporthe wehmeyeri
Diaporthe winteri
Diaporthe woodii
Diaporthe woolworthii
Diaporthe woroniniae
Diaporthe xanthii
Diaporthe xanthiicola
Diaporthe yerbae
Diaporthe zaviana
Diaporthe zeina
Diaporthe ziziphina
Diaporthe zopfii

References

 
Fungal plant pathogens and diseases
Sordariomycetes genera
Taxa named by Theodor Rudolph Joseph Nitschke
Taxa described in 1870